Ice is a song by Russian hip-hop artist Morgenshtern. The track was released on July 31, 2020.

Prehistory
On July 1, 2020, Morgenshtern released a snippet of the track. Later he announced that Ice will be a collaboration with another musician.

On July 28, 2020, Morgenstern published an appeal in which he said that the second artist for his song "Ice" threw him his verse, after which he began to ignore him for two weeks. In the appeal, Morgenstern asked the artist to respond but did not announce the name of the coauthor. Later, on July 29, published a "last appeal", in which he said that he gives the artist one day to respond otherwise Morgenstern releases the song on digital platforms, without specifying him as the author.

Commercial success
Like Morgenshtern's previous songs, the track "Ice" took a couple of hours to reach to top of the Apple Music and VK charts. During the first day, the music video on YouTube gained more than four million views and more than a million listens on VK. The song also received virality in the US on TikTok.

References

2020 songs
2020 singles
Russian pop songs
Morgenshtern songs